This is a list of law enforcement agencies in Northern Ireland.

Police
Police Service of Northern Ireland
Ministry of Defence Police
Belfast Harbour Police
Belfast International Airport Constabulary

Bodies with police powers
National Crime Agency
Northern Ireland Security Guard Service
Police Ombudsman for Northern Ireland
Bodies with limited executive powers
Border Force
Immigration Enforcement
His Majesty's Revenue and Customs
Driver and Vehicle Agency

Bodies with solely investigatory powers
Office for Security and Counter-Terrorism
Security Service
Serious Fraud Office

Bodies hosted by the Association of Chief Police Officers
National Wildlife Crime Unit
National Counter Terrorism Security Office
National Vehicle Crime Intelligence Service

Bodies hosted by territorial police forces
National Domestic Extremism and Disorder Intelligence Unit
Protection Command
National Fraud Intelligence Bureau

See also
List of law enforcement agencies in the United Kingdom, Crown Dependencies and British Overseas Territories
List of law enforcement agencies in England and Wales
List of law enforcement agencies in Scotland

References
List of UK police forces – Police.uk

Law enforcement in Northern Ireland
Government of Northern Ireland
Society of Northern Ireland
Northern Ireland peace process
Law enforcement
Lists of law enforcement agencies